Quake is a 2021 Icelandic drama film written and directed by Tinna Hrafnsdóttir.

Quake tells the story of an author and mother named Saga who, after an epileptic seizure, experiences memory loss at the same time as hidden memories of family secrets begin to resurface.

References

External links 
 

2020s Icelandic-language films
2022 drama films
2021 drama films
Icelandic drama films